Shongphoog Gewog (Dzongkha: ཤོང་ཕུག་), also spelled Shongphu is a gewog (village block) of Trashigang District, Bhutan.

References

Gewogs of Bhutan
Trashigang District